Gillmoss is an area in north Liverpool, Merseyside, England, located between Croxteth, Fazakerley and Kirkby.

Description
Gillmoss is a predominantly industrial area with little residential housing although pockets exist around the East Lancashire Road, and parts have been described as a 'ghost town' after years of decay.  More recently, a commercial development known as Stonebridge Park has been built as part of regeneration project in this part of north Liverpool which currently houses Euro Foodbrands Export Ltd, P.A Foods Ltd and Healthy Foods Online Ltd.

One of Liverpool's largest bus depots, originally built by Liverpool Corporation Transport but now owned by Stagecoach, is based in Gillmoss on the East Lancs Road.

Gillmoss falls between the neighbouring suburbs of Croxteth and Fazakerley with Kirkby nearby. As a small district, it is often merged with Croxteth, a larger suburb of the city.

References

External links

 Liverpool Street Gallery - Liverpool 11

Areas of Liverpool